The Cebu boobook or Cebu hawk-owl (Ninox rumseyi) is a species of owl in the family Strigidae. It is endemic to the Philippines. It was formerly considered a subspecies of the Philippine hawk-owl, but was reclassified in 2012, as voice and other data suggested placement in a distinct species.

Description and taxonomy 
EBird describes the bird as "A medium-sized owl of wooded areas on the island of Cebu. Head and upperparts dark brown and indistinctly barred. Underparts orange-brown. Shows some white speckling in the wing, a pale bar behind the shoulder, bright yellow eyes, and white eyebrows forming an arching V-shape. Note the large white throat patch. Unmistakable. No other owls occur in its range. Song is a distinctive “wip! Doo-wip! Doh” with the middle notes falling then rising, and the final note falling. Also gives single 'wip' notes and rasps."

The Cebu boobook is an earless species. Males and females are similar in appearance. It nests in natural cavities of older, larger trees.

Along with the Camiguin hawk-owl and Romblon boobook, it is the largest in the Philippine hawk-owl species complex reaching 25 cm tall versus the much smaller Luzon boobook, Mindanao boobook, Mindoro boobook and Sulu boobook, which range in size from 15 to 20 cm tall.

Habitat and conservation status 
Its natural habitats are subtropical or tropical moist lowland primary forest and secondary forests up to an altitude of 700 metres above sea level. It is also seen in clearings and plantations as long as there is nearby forest

The IUCN Red List classifies this bird as vulnerable with population estimates of 250 to 999 mature individuals with the belief that its population is on the lower estimate of that range. This species' main threat is habitat loss with wholesale clearance of forest habitats as a result of legal and illegal logging, mining and conversion into farmlands through slash-and-burn and urbanization. Cebu underwent severe deforestation in the 1890s and now just 0.03% or 15 km2 forest cover remains. The forests of Cebu continue to undergo hunting pressure and deforestation — further reducing what little there is remaining.

This has led to many other species sharing its range to also be endangered. It also shares a habitat with the Cebu flowerpecker which is one of the most endangered birds in the world and other endangered species such as the black shama and streak-breasted bulbul. This has led to many extinctions of species such as Cebu warty pig and possibly the Cebu amethyst brown dove and subspecies extinctions of Philippine oriole, blackish cuckooshrike, bar-bellied cuckooshrike, Philippine hanging parrot and more.

The Cebu boobook occurs in the Alcoy, Argao, Dalaguete, Tabunan and Boljoon protected forests, but like all places in the Philippines protection is lax.

There is no species-specific conservation program at present.

References

 Kennedy, R.S., Gonzales P.C., Dickinson E.C., Miranda, Jr, H.C., Fisher T.H. (2000) A Guide to the Birds of the Philippines, Oxford University Press, Oxford.

Cebu boobook
Birds of Cebu
Cebu hawk-owl
Cebu boobook
Cebu boobook
Cebu boobook
Cebu boobook
Cebu boobook
Cebu boobook
Cebu boobook